Bad Apple may refer to:
 Bad apples, an English metaphor
 "Bad Apple!!", background music from a 1998 Touhou Project game, which spawned a 2007  remix and 2009 shadow-art music video
 "Bad Apple" (Basement song) (2012)
 Bad Apple (film), a 2004 film by Adam Bernstein
 Bad Apples (film), a 2018 film by Bryan Coyne
 Bad Apples Music, an Indigenous Australian record label

See also
"One Bad Apple", a 1970 song by The Osmonds
"One Bad Apple" (My Little Pony: Friendship Is Magic), an episode of My Little Pony: Friendship Is Magic